The Minister of Culture and Equality  (sometimes just kulturminister or likestillingsminister depending on context) is a councilor of state and chief of the Norway's Ministry of Culture. The ministry is responsible for the government's policy related to culture, church affairs, religion, media, sports and gambling. Subordinate agencies include the Gaming and Foundation Authority, the National Archival Services, the National Library, the Arts Council and the Media Authority. The portfolio includes issues related to the Church of Norway.

The position was created as the Minister of Culture and Sciences in 1981, resulting in a split of the responsibilities of the former Minister of Church Affairs and Education, where issues related to culture and research were moved to the new post. Science issues remained part of the portfolio until 1989, when they were swapped with religious issues with the Minister of Education and Research, creating the Minister of Culture and Church Affairs. This lasted for a year, when church and religious affairs were again resumed by the Minister of Education, Research and Church Affairs. This situation was retained until 2001, when the portfolio again became the Minister of Culture and Church Affairs. From 2009 the "Church Affairs" was transferred to the Ministry of Government Administration, Reform and Church Affairs as minister Anniken Huitfeldt was not a member of the Church of Norway. Issues related to religion remained within the portfolio.

When Solberg's Cabinet took office in 2013 church affairs was again included in the title and portfolio but with less significance than previously due to the increased autonomy given to the Church of Norway in 2012.

The current minister is Anette Trettebergstuen.

Key
The following lists the minister, their party, date of assuming and leaving office, their tenure in years and days, and the cabinet they served in.

Ministers

References

Culture
 
Culture ministers